Earlton may refer to:

Earlton, Kansas, a town in the United States
Earlton, New York, a town in the United States
Earlton, Ontario, a town in Canada
Earlton (Timiskaming Regional) Airport, an airport near Earlton, Ontario

See also
Erlton, a neighbourhood in Calgary